Peter Jon Maassen (born January 14, 1955) is an American lawyer who serves as the chief justice of the Alaska Supreme Court. He was appointed in 2012.

Education 

Maassen received a Bachelor of Arts from Hope College in 1977 and a Juris Doctor from the University of Michigan Law School in 1980.

Career 

From June to August 1979 Maassen was a law clerk in general litigation practice Maun, Green, Hayes, Simon, Murray and Johannesen in Minneapolis. From January 1980 to 1987 he was a law clerk turned associate with Burr, Pease and Kurtz, P.C. in Anchorage. In 1988 he worked in the Office of General Counsel at the United States Department of Commerce. From November 1988 to September 1989, he was an associate with Bishop, Cook, Purcell and Reynolds in Washington, D.C., he returned to Alaska and from 1990 to 1994, he was a partner with Burr, Pease and Kurtz, P.C. From 1994 to 2012, he was a founding partner with Ingaldson, Maassen and Fitzgerald, P.C.

Alaska Supreme Court 

In August 2012, Maasseen was appointed by Governor Sean Parnell to the Alaska Supreme Court to replace Justice Morgan Christen, who was elevated to the United States Court of Appeals for the Ninth Circuit.

In November 2022, he was named Chief Justice of the Alaska Supreme Court, succeeding Daniel Winfree. His term as chief justice began on February 7, 2023.

References

External links

Biography of Justice Peter J. Maassen

|-

1955 births
21st-century American judges
Chief Justices of the Alaska Supreme Court
Hope College alumni
Justices of the Alaska Supreme Court
Living people
Place of birth missing (living people)
University of Michigan Law School alumni